Goff is a surname. See the article for a list of people with the surname.

Goff may also refer to:

First name 
 Goff Letts, politician in Northern Territory, Australia
 Goff Richards, English brass band arranger and composer

Places 
 Goff, Kansas, small city in the United States
 Goff Farm, Massachusetts, United States
 Goff Homestead, Massachusetts, United States
 Goff Petroglyph Site, Arkansas, United States

Other uses 
 GOFF, a file format

See also
 Le Goff, a surname
 Goffs (disambiguation)
 Goffe
 Gough (disambiguation)
 Goff's Caye, an island of Belize